BlackJack is a Swedish dansband formed in Sundsvall in 1990. Their most famous hit song with "Inget stoppar oss nu". Throughout the years, the band has scored several other Svensktoppen hits, including "Om det känns rätt" in 1996.

The band was founded by Tony Ljungström, who also appeared in the film, and Torbjörn Eriksson (former Kapellmeister).

The band has played at TV shows like "Bingolotto", "Go'kväll", "Jeopardy!" and "Mat-Tina". They have also appeared in a Europolitan commercial.

Personnel 

 Kjelle Danielsson – vocals
 Peder Matz – keyboards, accordion
 Ove Olsson – guitar, vocals
 Mikael Östlin – drums
 Morgan Östlin – keyboards, saxophones

Discography

Albums

Compilation albums

Singles 
1991: "Den stora kärleken" (a 5-track CD)
"Den stora kärleken" (Kent Carlsson)
"Girl on Swing" (Bob Miranda)
"Last Date" (Boudleux Bryant-Floyd Cramer)
"Du är vinden" (Johnny Thunqvist)
"Tillsammans genom gränden" (Keith Almgren-Lars-Åke Svantesson)

Charting in Svensktoppen
1996: "Om det känns rätt"
1997: "Torka tåren"
1998: "Du vet"
1999: "Vinden har vänt"
2000: "Nu är det lördag igen"
2001: "Sommar flickor"
2001: "Får jag låna din fru ikväll"
2002: "Ge mig en chans"

Citations

External links 

 
 

Musical groups established in 1991
Dansbands
Sundsvall
1991 establishments in Sweden